A spare ratio or spares ratio is the percentage of unused vehicles operated by a public transport operator during peak service periods. It is calculated as a simple percentage of the total fleet size.

In the United States, the Federal Transit Administration (FTA) sets a 20 percent guideline for the spare ratio in a fleet of at least 50 vehicles.

References

Public transport